The so-called Really Good Friends (RGF) club is a sub-group of members of the World Trade Organization formed in 2012 to discuss the possibility of a services liberalization agreement. Most members of the 'Really Good Friends' group are top global economies which account for the bulk of world trade, with the EU and the US representing 40%. The participating countries started crafting the proposed Trade in Services Agreement in February 2012.

The original members of the RGF group were:

 
 
 
 
 
 
 
 
 
 
 
 
 
 
 
 

Singapore left the RGF Group and the following members joined in late 2012:

References

External links

World Trade Organization
2012 in international relations